St Georges Terrace (colloquially known as "The Terrace") is the main street in the city of Perth, Western Australia. It runs parallel to the Swan River and forms the major arterial road through the central business district. 
 
Its western end is marked by the Barracks Arch near Parliament House across the Mitchell Freeway; the eastern end joins Adelaide Terrace at the intersection with Victoria Avenue.

Naming
St Georges Terrace was named after St George's Cathedral. Originally, houses occupied by clergy of the cathedral and lay clerks of the cathedral choir constituted a substantial portion of the Terrace. Some of these houses such as The Deanery remain, however the majority of these were demolished in the 1960s. The apostrophe was removed from the name in the 1980s.

Streetscapes
The level of St Georges Terrace is in effect at the top of a ridge, where the short roads that descend southerly towards Perth Water all provide views of the Swan River, including Barrack Street, Sherwood Court, Howard Street, William Street, Mill Street and Spring Street.

Buildings 
The main streetscape between Barrack Street and William Street in the 1930s and 1940s constituted considerable uniformity of design and building height. By the late 1970s removal of significant older buildings for taller more modern buildings changed this permanently. Perth's earlier tallest buildings were located on St Georges Terrace, including the Colonial Mutual Life building (tallest building in Perth from 1936 to 1962), subsequent tallest buildings were: Citibank House (37 St Georges Terrace, 1962 until 1970; it was then known as the T & G Building), Parmelia House (191 St Georges Terrace, 1970 to 1973), 140 St Georges Terrace (AMP Building, 1975 to 1976), Allendale Square (77 St Georges Terrace, 1976 to 1977), St Martins Tower (44 St Georges Terrace, 1978 to 1988), BankWest Tower (108 St Georges Terrace, 1988 to 1992) and Central Park (152-158 St Georges Terrace, tallest since 1992).

A number of other buildings are along the road:
 100 St Georges Terrace
 Brookfield Place
 Christian Brothers' College
 The Cloisters
 London Court
 Old Perth Boys School
 Palace Hotel
 QV.1
 St George's House
 Technical School

Footpath
Set into the footpath along the street are a series of commemorative plaques honouring notable figures in Western Australia's history. Originally 150 plaques were installed in 1979, as part of the WAY '79 celebrations, marking the state's 150th year of European settlement. Since then, additional plaques have been added, so that there was one for each year from 1829 to 1999. In 2014, the 1959 plaque, commemorating Rolf Harris, was removed after Harris was convicted of sexual assault.

Intersections

See also

Further reading

 Austen, Tom  (1988) The Streets of Old Perth St George Books. 
 Edmonds, Jack (editor) (1979) Swan River colony : life in Western Australia since the early colonial settlement, illustrated by pictures from an exhibition mounted by West Australian Newspapers Ltd. as a contribution to celebrations for the state's 150th year Perth: West Australian Newspapers. 
 Stannage, C. T  (1979) The people of Perth : a social history of Western Australia's capital city Perth: Carroll's for Perth City Council.

References

External links

 
Streets in Perth central business district, Western Australia